HMS London was a  destroyer of the Royal Navy.

Construction and design
London was one of two County-class destroyers ordered under the British Admiralty's 1956–57 shipbuilding programme. She was laid down at Swan Hunter's Wallsend, Tyne and Wear shipyard on 26 February 1960 and launched by Princess Alice, Duchess of Gloucester on 7 December 1961. The ship was completed on 14 November 1963.

The ship was propelled by a combination of steam turbines and gas turbines in a Combined steam and gas (COSAG) arrangement, driving two propeller shafts.

A twin launcher for the Seaslug anti-aircraft missile was fitted aft. Up to 39 Seaslugs could be carried horizontally in a magazine that ran much of the length of the ship. Close-in anti-aircraft protection was provided by a pair of Seacat (missile) launchers, while two twin QF 4.5 inch Mark V gun mounts were fitted forward. A helicopter deck and hangar allowed a single Westland Wessex helicopter to be operated.

A Type 965 long-range air-search radar and a Type 278 height-finding radar was fitted on the ship's mainmast, with a Type 992Q navigation radar and an array of ESM aerials were mounted on the ship's foremast. Type 901 fire control radar for the Seaslug missile was mounted aft. Type 184 sonar was fitted.

Royal Navy service

Early service
London commissioned at Swan Hunter's yard in Wallsend on 14 November 1963 under Captain J.C. Bartosik and was initially fully employed setting her armament to work, successfully firing her Sea Slug surface-to-air missile for the first time off Aberporth in April 1964. After working up, during which she entertained the Duke of Edinburgh on board, she crossed the Atlantic in September 1964. She visited Bermuda and Houston before joining a special squadron led by Vice-Admiral Sir Fitzroy Talbot on a round of visits to the South American part of his command. Passing through Panama, she visited Peru, Chile, Uruguay and Brazil before proceeding via Tristan da Cunha to Simonstown, where she spent Christmas. New Year's was spent at sea en route to Mauritius, where the ship's helicopter was used to build a TV mast. She then deployed to the Far East, visiting Hong Kong, Bangkok, Subic, Singapore and ports in Malaya. During this time she was part of a powerful fleet whose presence acted as a deterrent to President Sukarno of Indonesia's attempt to intimidate the infant Federation of Malaysia through 'Confrontation'. She then returned to the UK via Aden and assisted the Adrian Augusta adrift in the Red Sea before entering Suez, proceeding to Gibraltar, then Portsmouth and took part in Navy Days at Portsmouth in 1965.

More world travel
On Easter Monday 1969 London sailed for the Far East; she had onboard Admiral of the Fleet Sir Varyl Begg GCB., DSO., DSC. who was taking passage to take up his appointment as Governor and C-in-C Gibraltar. The ship sailed into Gibraltar on 17 April flying the flag of an Admiral of the Fleet. After that, she continued her passage, calling in at Simonstown and then onto Beira Patrol before heading for Gan and Singapore. She accordingly spent the period from June to late September in the South China Sea visiting Hong Kong, Manila and Subic Bay as well as spending two weeks in Japan as well as spells in her base port of Singapore. After three days of exceptional hospitality, London sailed for Wellington and Lyttleton. She then crossed the Tasman Sea to Hobart and after that up to Melbourne, where the ship's company were pleased to experience the Gold Cup.

The ship spent two weeks in Sydney before steaming back to Singapore for Christmas and the New Year. She subsequently sailed across the Indian Ocean to carry out a short stint of Beira patrol; she then sailed round the Cape of Good Hope and on across the Atlantic to carry out Sea Slug missile firings in a tactical setting with the US Navy. A short visit to St Vincent and Puerto Rico allowed the ship's company a few days ashore before London headed back to Portsmouth, having completed an extremely busy 12 months. There ensued docking and repairing defects in Portsmouth before carrying out workup in October and visits to Greenock before Christmas leave, prior to sailing in early February 1971 for a nine-month tour of duty in the Mediterranean. This period allowed for a wonderful opportunity for cultural visits in Leghorn (for Pisa and Florence, Civitia Vecchia for Rome and Pompeii and Naples as well as Trieste from where a visit to Venice was possible). The ship called in at Crete for the 30th anniversary of the battle in May 1941. She also called in at Cyprus and Istanbul from where a trip round the Black Sea included a visit to Samsun. The ship gave station leave in Gibraltar and Naples; returning to Portsmouth in early November 1971. In 31 months she had carried out two deployments lasting 21 months, had spent six weeks working up between deployments as well as visits to Scotland and missile firing practice at Aberforth.

'Lasts and decommissioning

London was chosen to represent Great Britain for the celebrations in New York City for the American Bicentennial celebrations in July 1976.  The crew went to great lengths to make the ship clean and 'ship-shape' for the visit, and London hosted several diplomatic and social functions while she was there.  Her crew enjoyed an extended liberty period out on the town.
 
London was the last ship to leave Malta when the Maltese government closed the base. She attended the 1977 Silver Jubilee Fleet Review off Spithead when she was part of the First Flotilla.

The ship was the last RN vessel capable of firing Mark 1 Sea Slug missiles,firing the last 17 Mk 1 seaslugs on 9 December 1981 as targets for HMS Cardiff and Glasgows Sea Darts  and 4.5 shells as targets for HMS Brilliant.  Seawolf and on the 10 December 1981, the ship had the distinction of being the ship that carried out the Navy's final twin turret broadside when all four of her 4.5 inch guns were fired at once 

London was decommissioned in late December 1981 after completing a three-month deployment to the West Indies as Belize Guardship, during which her crew were involved in the granting of independence to Antigua.

Pakistan naval service

London was sold to Pakistan on 23 March 1982 and recommissioned Babur under Captain Mukhtar Azam. Babur was decommissioned from Pakistani service in 1993 and sold for scrap in 1995.

Commanding officers
Notable commanding officers include J C Bartosik between 1963-1966 and Ronald Forrest during 1970-1972.

References

Publications

 

County-class destroyers of the Royal Navy
Ships built on the River Tyne
1961 ships
Cold War destroyers of the United Kingdom
County-class destroyers of the Pakistan Navy